Thomas Beirne may refer to:
 Thomas Beirne (writer), Irish language writer and activist
 Thomas Beirne (businessman) (1860–1949), businessman, politician and philanthropist in Australia